The Garden of Fear and Other Stories is an anthology of fantasy and science fiction stories anonymously edited by William L. Crawford.  It was published as A Crawford Publication in 1945 in an edition of 48,000 copies.  The H. P. Lovecraft story first appeared in the magazine The Rainbow.  The other stories originally appeared in the magazine Marvel Tales.

Contents
"The Garden of Fear", by Robert E. Howard
"The Man with the Hour Glass", by Lloyd Arthur Eshbach
"Celephais", by H. P. Lovecraft
"Mars Colonizes", by Miles J. Breuer, M.D.
"The Golden Bough", by David H. Keller, M.D.

Adaptations
The Howard story was adapted by Marvel Comics as a Conan tale in Conan the Barbarian #9 ("The Garden of Fear", Sept 1971) by writer Roy Thomas and artist Barry Smith.

References

1945 anthologies
Science fiction anthologies
Fantasy anthologies